Peter Barrable (16 June 1943 – 17 September 2015) was a South African cricketer. He played sixteen first-class matches for Northerns between 1964 and 1975.

References

External links
 

1943 births
2015 deaths
South African cricketers
Northerns cricketers
People from Benoni
Sportspeople from Gauteng